Rud-e Sanib (also Romanized as Rūd-e Sanīb; also known as Sanīib) is a village in Taftan-e Jonubi Rural District, Nukabad District, Khash County, Sistan and Baluchestan Province, Iran. At the 2006 census, its population was 311, in 54 families.

References 

Populated places in Khash County